Angira Dhar is an Indian actress who appears in Hindi films. Her most notable work includes her role in web series Bang Baaja Baaraat and the film Love per Square Foot.

Early and personal life 
Dhar is a Kashmiri Hindu and was brought up in Mumbai.

Dhar married Love per Square Foot director, Anand Tiwari, in a secret ceremony on 30 April 2021.

Career

Television career
Dhar began a career in TV production with Channel V. She also worked behind the camera as an assistant film director. During her time at Channel V she was offered the anchor position on the show 'Beg Borrow Steal' by UTV Bindass.

Film career
She made her Bollywood debut in 2013, starring in the film called Ek Bura Aadmi starring Arunoday Singh.

In 2015, she was offered the female lead in a web series by Y-Films, titled Bang Baaja Baarat in which she essayed the role of a spunky, feisty, young independent girl. The show revolves around a much-in-love couple, Shahana (Dhar) and Pawan (Ali Fazal) who decide to get married in an elaborate wedding. However, since Pawan is Brahmin and Shahana is Punjabi, chaos unfolds when both the families meet. The second season of the show started in September 2016. It met with positive reviews.

In 2018, she played the lead actor for the first film to be directed by Anand Tiwari under RSVP (Ronnie Screwvala Production) titled Love per Square Foot opposite Vicky Kaushal. It was the first Bollywood film to release directly on a streaming platform. In 2019, she played British Intelligence officer in the film Commando 3.

She played a lawyer in Ajay Devgn's film Runway 34.

Filmography

Films

Web series

Television

Music videos

References

External links

Actresses from Mumbai
Living people
Year of birth missing (living people)
Indian film actresses
Kashmiri Pandits
Indian women
Indian people of Kashmiri descent